is a Japanese football player who currently plays for Ventforet Kofu.

Club career
Mitsuhira begin youth career with Kanagawa University since 2006 to 2009 after graduation at college, he signed to Shonan Bellmare in 2008 as first career and back in 2010. After leaving in shonan, Mitsuhira signed a contract with Oita Trinita for 2 years in 2011. Mitsuhira signed a contract with Kyoto Sanga for 2 years in 2013. After left container at club, he return to Oita Trinita from 2015. He brought his club promoted to J1 League from 2019 after finished 2nd place in 2018. He left the club in 2020 after contract expired. In 2021, Matsuhira signed a contract to J2 club, Ventforet Kofu. On 16 October 2022, he scored at emperor's cup final with 26th minute at Nissan Stadium as well brought his club won Emperor's Cup for the first time in history after defeat Sanfrecce Hiroshima penalty 5–4.

Career Statistics
Update; end of the 2022 season.

Honours

Club
Ventforet Kofu
 Emperor's Cup: 2022

References

External links

 Profile at Oita Trinita

1988 births
Living people
Kanagawa University alumni
People from Hadano, Kanagawa
Association football people from Kanagawa Prefecture
Japanese footballers
J1 League players
J2 League players
J3 League players
Shonan Bellmare players
Oita Trinita players
Kyoto Sanga FC players
Ventforet Kofu players
Association football forwards
Universiade bronze medalists for Japan
Universiade medalists in football
Medalists at the 2009 Summer Universiade